Barrio Suecia (Spanish for "Swedish neighborhood") is a section of Santiago, Chile, centered on Calle Suecia ("Sweden Street"), in the upscale Providencia municipality, which once included many pubs, discos and restaurants.  Frequently the area is simply referred to as "Calle Suecia."

A commonly used pun is formed by changing the word Suecia to sucia, Spanish for "dirty", because the area is notorious for drunkenness and debauched nightlife.

The amount of venues on Calle Suecia is now much less than previously with many having closed down.

External links
 Santiago nightlife
 Barrio Suecia on-Line

Entertainment districts in Chile
Geography of Santiago, Chile